Genouillac may refer to the following places in France:

 Genouillac, Charente, a commune of the Charente département
 Genouillac, Creuse, a commune of the Creuse département